The Gumista River (Abkhaz: Гәымсҭа) is a river in Abkhazia, Georgia. It is formed by the joining of the Eastern and Western Gumista Rivers. It is nourished by snow, rain and underground water. The river flows into the Black Sea. The length of the Gumista is 12 km and the drainage basin is approximately 576 km2. The average annual discharge of the river is 30m³/s.

References

Rivers of Abkhazia